Amauropelta semilunata, synonym Thelypteris semilunata, is a species of fern in the family Thelypteridaceae. It is endemic to Ecuador. Its natural habitat is subtropical or tropical moist montane forests.

References

 

Thelypteridaceae
Endemic flora of Ecuador
Least concern plants
Taxonomy articles created by Polbot
Taxobox binomials not recognized by IUCN